Anna Battke (born 3 January 1985 in Düsseldorf) is a German pole vaulter.

Biography
She finished eighth at the 2008 World Indoor Championships in Valencia, Spain. Her personal best is 4.68 metres, achieved in 2009 in Berlin.

See also
 Germany all-time top lists - Pole vault

References

External links

1985 births
Living people
German female pole vaulters
Sportspeople from Düsseldorf